1865 West Sydney colonial by-election may refer to 

 1865 West Sydney colonial by-election 1 held in February 1865
 1865 West Sydney colonial by-election 2 held in July 1865
 1865 West Sydney colonial by-election 3 held in October 1865

See also
 List of New South Wales state by-elections